Zaid Majed Al-Bawardi (born 26 January 1997) is a Saudi Arabian  professional footballer who currently plays for Al-Shabab as a goalkeeper.

Career

Al-Nassr FC
Climbed to the first team in the 2018-2019 season and participated in the first match in 2019 AFC Champions League against the team Zob Ahan ended the match with a 0-0

Club career statistics

Honours

Club
Al-Nassr
 Saudi Professional League: 2018–19
 Saudi Super Cup: 2019

External links

References

1997 births
Living people
Sportspeople from Riyadh
Association football goalkeepers
Saudi Arabian footballers
Saudi Arabia youth international footballers
Saudi Arabia international footballers
Al Nassr FC players
Al-Shabab FC (Riyadh) players
Saudi Professional League players
Olympic footballers of Saudi Arabia
Footballers at the 2020 Summer Olympics